Edvard Otto Vilhelm Gylling (30 November 1881 – 14 June 1938) was a prominent Social Democratic and later Communist politician in Finland, later leader of Soviet Karelia.

Biography
Gylling was born in Kuopio in 1881. He was a member of Parliament of Finland for the Social Democratic Party of Finland 1908–1917 and active during the Finnish Civil War as Commissar of Finance for the Revolutionary "Red" Finnish government. On 1 March 1918, a Treaty between the socialist governments of Russia and Finland was signed in St Petersburg. The Treaty was signed by Vladimir Lenin and Joseph Stalin from the Russian side and by Council of Peoples Representatives of Finland Edvard Gylling and Oskari Tokoi.

After the Reds lost the war, Gylling fled to Sweden, but later moved to the Soviet Union. He became one of the main leaders of the Karelo-Finnish ASSR as Chairman of Council of People's Commissars of the Karelo-Finnish SSR 1920–1935.

He was accused of nationalism, removed in 1935 and arrested in 1937 as a part of the Finnish Operation of the NKVD. There are some contradictions concerning Gylling's death. According to earlier Soviet sources, Gylling died in August 1944, but according to other sources he was actually executed earlier, 1940 or 1938. According to the most recent information, the most likely date of his execution was 14 June 1938. Gylling was posthumously rehabilitated by the Soviet authorities on 16 July 1955.

References

Further reading
Cotter, Arthur The Finns (New York: The National Council, Department of Missions and Church Extension, 1923) 
Ylarakkola, Arvo Edvard Gylling: Ita-Karjalan rakentaja (Finn-kirja (1976)) Finnish 
Hodgson, John H Edvard Gylling ja Otto W. Kuusinen asiakirjojen valossa 1918–1920 (Tammi. 1974) Finnish

1881 births
1938 deaths
People from Kuopio
People from Kuopio Province (Grand Duchy of Finland)
Swedish-speaking Finns
Social Democratic Party of Finland politicians
Communist Party of Finland politicians
Communist Party of the Soviet Union members
Members of the Parliament of Finland (1908–09)
Members of the Parliament of Finland (1909–10)
Members of the Parliament of Finland (1911–13)
Members of the Parliament of Finland (1913–16)
Members of the Parliament of Finland (1916–17)
Members of the Parliament of Finland (1917–19)
Finnish People's Delegation members
University of Helsinki alumni
Academic staff of the University of Helsinki
Great Purge victims from Finland
Soviet rehabilitations
People from the Republic of Karelia
Recipients of the Order of the Red Banner of Labour
Finnish amputees
Finnish Marxists
Finnish statisticians
Finnish communists
Scientists with disabilities